is a Japanese comedy-drama streaming television series co-directed by Yuko Hakota. Loosely based on the 2012 manga  by Eri Sakai, it tells the story of one man's experience being pregnant. The series premiered on Netflix on April 21, 2022 and on TV Tokyo on January 5, 2023. It stars Takumi Saitoh as Kentaro Hiyama, alongside Juri Ueno.

Synopsis
He's Expecting follows the story of "Kentaro Hiyama, an elite ad man, [who] suddenly finds out one day that he is pregnant."

Cast and characters

Main
Takumi Saitoh as Kentaro Hiyama:A 37-year-old advertising executive who suddenly becomes pregnant. He decides to keep the baby to change people's perspective on male pregnancy. To prepare for the role, Saitoh watched the 1994 Arnold Schwarzenegger film Junior and received advice on how to wear a large prosthetic belly by Ueno.
Juri Ueno as Aki Seto:A 35-year-old freelance journalist and Kentaro's lover who begins to consider the possibility of motherhood. Ueno read the manga and was inspired by how there was a significant amount of female characters.
Mariko Tsutsui as Tomoko Hiyama:The loving, hardworking, overprotective mother of Kentaro, and estranged wife of Eiichi.
Yaeko Kiyose as Young Tomoko
Ryo Iwamatsu as Shigeru Osugi:Kentaro’s boss.
Kazuya Takahashi as Dr. Tatsuomi Nakajima:A doctor who specializes in the phenomenon of male pregnancy. He is Kentaro’s and Miyaji’s doctor.
Shohei Uno as Shota Miyaji:Kentaro’s first real friend and fellow pregnant man.
Maho Yamada as Noriko Miyaji:Miyaji’s thoughtful wife, who gave birth to their first child, Takuya. After having her first child she struggled to get pregnant again.
Lily Franky as Eiichi Takeda:The estranged husband of Tomoko and father of Kentaro, who he gave birth to.
Kazuki Kawakami as Young Eiichi

Supporting
Gaku Hosokawa as Masato Tanabe:Kentaro's chauvinistic coworker who takes his place as the advertising  director for UNIVE.
Kou Maehara as Satoru Sawabe:Kentaro's coworker
Yusaku Mori as Hikaru Endo:Kentaro's coworker
Ai Yamamoto as Nana Koga:Kentaro's coworker and only female in his advertising team for UNIVE.
Shima Ise as Yukari Matsuno
Yukiko Shinohara as Eri:Aki’s coworker and ex-chief editor.
Atsushi Hashimoto as Hiroki Takagi:Aki’s journalist friend.
Yuriko Ono as Shiori:A friend of Aki's
Mai Kiryu as Narumi Seto:Aki’s younger sister
Shigeru Saiki as Hideo Seto:Aki’s father
Toshie Negishi as Yasuko Seto:Aki’s mother

Episodes

Series overview

Season 1 (2022)

Production

Development

On April 8, 2021, it was announced that Netflix and TV Tokyo would co-produced a live-action adaptation of the manga series Kentaro Hiyama's First Pregnancy. According to manga author, Eri Sakai, development for the series began two years before the initial series announcement.

During the Netflix Festival Japan 2021 livestream on November 10, 2021, lead series director Yuko Hakota revealed that the first season will consist of eight episodes, each with a running time around 23 minutes.

Casting
Alongside the initial series announcement, it was confirmed that Takumi Saitoh and Juri Ueno would star in the series, as Kentaro Hiyama and Aki Seto respectively. The cast also includes Mariko Tsutsui, Lily Franky, Ryo Iwamatsu and Kazuya Takahashi.

Filming
Principal photography for the first season took place in 2021.

Reception
The series received mixed-to-positive reviews. Praise was aimed at the performances from the two leads and the progressive commentary the series presented. However, there was some criticism aimed at the inconsistent tone and lack of any real stakes.

References

External links
  at TV Tokyo 
 
 

Japanese-language Netflix original programming
2020s comedy-drama television series
2022 Japanese television series debuts
Japanese television dramas based on manga
Japanese-language television shows
Television series set in the 2020s
Television shows set in Japan
Japanese drama television series
Pregnancy-themed television shows